Huejotitán is a village and seat of the municipality of Huejotitán, in the northern Mexican state of Chihuahua. As of 2010, Huejotitán had a population of 243, down from 244 as of 2005.

Huejotitan was the site of a Jesuit mission to the Tarahumara established about 1640.

References

Populated places in Chihuahua (state)